Nendeln is one of the four railway stations serving Liechtenstein. It is located in the village of Nendeln, in Eschen municipality. The station is served by eighteen trains per day, nine in each direction between Switzerland and Austria.

Overview

Customs
When the next station in the direction of Austria (Schaanwald) is not used, which has been the case since 2013, Nendeln is for customs purposes, a border station for passengers arriving from Austria. Liechtenstein is in a customs union with Switzerland. Customs checks may be performed in the station or on board trains by Swiss officials. Systematic passport controls were abolished when Liechtenstein joined the Schengen Area in 2011.

Gallery

See also 
 Schaan-Vaduz railway station
 Forst Hilti railway station
 Schaanwald railway station
 Rail transport in Liechtenstein
 Railway stations in Liechtenstein

References

External links

Railway stations in Liechtenstein
Railway stations opened in 1872